Muhammad Fandi bin Othman (born 25 April 1992 in Johor Bahru, Johor) is a Malaysian professional footballer who plays as left back for Malaysia Super League side Kelantan United.

Club career

Fandi was once given a trial from Slovakian team, FC ViOn Zlaté Moravce.

On 29 December 2017, it was announced that Fandi signed a contract with Malaysia Premier League club Felcra for the 2018 Malaysia Premier League.

Kedah
On 3 March 2021 Fandi agreed to join Malaysia Super League side Kedah Darul Aman. He made his league debut with the club on 17 March, in a 3–1 home win against Petaling Jaya City FC.

Honours
Johor Darul Takzim
 Malaysian Charity Shield: 2015 Winner

See also
 Harimau Muda A
 Malaysia national football team

References

1992 births
Malaysian footballers
Living people
Malaysian people of Malay descent
People from Johor Bahru
Johor Darul Ta'zim F.C. players
Melaka United F.C. players
Kelantan United F.C. players
Malaysia Super League players
Association football fullbacks
Association football wingers
Footballers at the 2010 Asian Games
Footballers at the 2014 Asian Games
Southeast Asian Games gold medalists for Malaysia
Southeast Asian Games medalists in football
Competitors at the 2011 Southeast Asian Games
Asian Games competitors for Malaysia